The West Asian Football Federation Championship, or simply WAFF Championship, is an international association football competition contested by the senior men's national teams of the members of the West Asian Football Federation (WAFF), the governing body of football in Western Asia. The championship has been held, on average, every two years.

The current champion is Bahrain, having defeated hosts Iraq in the 2019 final. The most successful team is Iran, with four titles; however, they do not compete in the competition anymore as they are no longer members of the WAFF.

History 
The inaugural WAFF Championship was held in 2000 in Jordan, with Iran winning the first edition. It was hosted in memory of Hussein of Jordan, who had died a year prior. The Al Hussein Cup, assigned to the winner of each tournament, was designed and manufactured in Italy in 2000, and is made of silver and copper.

Results 

 a.e.t.: after extra time
 pen.: after penalty shoot-out
 TBD: to be determined
 Notes

Teams reaching the top four 

* = hosts
1 = includes semi-finals in case there was no third-place match
2 = semi-final

Records and statistics

Top goalscorers by tournament

All-time table

Under-age tournaments

Under-23 

The WAFF U-23 Championship is an international football competition contested by the West Asian men's under-23 national teams of the WAFF member associations. The competition began in 2015, with Iran winning the inaugural competition.

 Notes

* = hosts

Under-18 

The WAFF U-18 Championship is an international football competition contested by the West Asian men's under-18 national teams of the WAFF member associations. The competition began in 2018, with Iraq winning the inaugural competition.

 Notes

 a.e.t.: after extra time
 pen.: after penalty shoot-out
 TBD: to be determined

Under-16 

The WAFF U-16 Championship is an international football competition contested by the West Asian men's under-16 national teams of the WAFF member associations. The competition began in 2005, with Iran winning the inaugural competition.

 Notes

* = hosts

See also
 WAFF Women's Championship
 Arabian Gulf Cup
 FIFA Arab Cup
 AFC Asian Cup
 AFF Championship
 CAFA Championship
 EAFF E-1 Football Championship
 SAFF Championship

References

External links 
 
 RSSSF.com

 
International association football competitions in Asia
International association football competitions in the Middle East
Football in the Arab world